Justin Hawley McAuliffe (born October 7, 1987) is an American entrepreneur and philanthropist.  He is the grandson of Barron Hilton and the great-grandson of Conrad Hilton, founder of Hilton Hotels. He is the founder and CEO of Acceleron Digital, a digital marketing agency.

Personal life
McAuliffe was born in New York City. He was raised in Greenwich, Connecticut, and is a graduate of Brunswick School. He is an alumnus of the Cornell University School of Hotel Administration.

Career
McAuliffe is the founder and CEO of Acceleron Digital, a digital marketing agency focusing on web development and online promotions. Acceleron is also a start-up factory that develops and launches internal businesses.
 
He is an entrepreneur, having worked on several start-ups in the past. He worked on the Ready, Set, Travel concept, an airport security-friendly toiletry kit for travelers.

In 2019, he joined the board of the Conrad N. Hilton Foundation, which employs him as a Program-Related Investment Analyst.

References

1987 births
American chief executives
Living people
Brunswick School alumni
Cornell University School of Hotel Administration alumni
Conrad Hilton family
Philanthropists from New York (state)